Irene in Time is a 2009 American independent film directed by Henry Jaglom. It marked the second collaboration between director Jaglom and  actress Tanna Frederick, who also starred in Jaglom's 2006 film Hollywood Dreams. Irene also starred Victoria Tennant, Lanre Idewu, and Andrea Marcovicci.

References

External links 
 
 

2009 films
American independent films
American romantic comedy-drama films
2009 romantic comedy-drama films
2009 independent films
Films directed by Henry Jaglom
2009 comedy films
2009 drama films
2000s English-language films
2000s American films